Daryl Lamont Smith (born March 14, 1982) is a former American football linebacker. He was drafted by the Jacksonville Jaguars in the second round of the 2004 NFL Draft. He played college football at Georgia Tech. Smith has also played for the Baltimore Ravens.

College career 
Smith attended Georgia Tech in Atlanta, Georgia. At Georgia Tech, he was a four-year letterman and a team captain who led the team in tackles for two of his four years. He started 44 of 46 games while at Georgia Tech, recording 383 tackles, 15 sacks, and three interceptions.

Professional career

Jacksonville Jaguars
The Jacksonville Jaguars selected Smith in the second round (39th overall) of the 2004 NFL Draft. He was the fifth linebacker drafted in 2004.

On July 24, 2004, the Jacksonville Jaguars signed Smith to a four-year, $3.25 million contract that includes a signing bonus of $952,000.

In his rookie season, he started 13 games and played in 15, but was slowed by a knee injury in the middle of the season.  However, he still managed to finish eighth on the team in tackles with 78, and record two sacks, one interception and one fumble recovery. Has started 90 of 92 games and missed only three games due to injuries.

He earned AFC Defensive Player of the Week honors in the first week of the 2010 NFL Season for a performance against the Denver Broncos that included 7 tackles and an interception that sealed the win for the Jaguars.

On November 28, 2010, Smith became the Jacksonville Jaguars all-time leader in tackles, surpassing former safety Donovin Darius.

Daryl Smith has passed the 100 tackle mark in seven straight years as of 2011.

Smith missed the first six games of the 2012 season due to injury. He was placed on the injured reserve-designated for return list on October 25, meaning he was eligible to return in week 15. He returned to play the New England Patriots in week 16 and recorded four tackles.

Smith became a free agent on March 12, 2013.

Baltimore Ravens
Smith signed a one-year contract with the defending Super Bowl XLVII champions Baltimore Ravens on June 5, 2013. The signing was meant to strengthen the Ravens' Inside Linebacker core following Ray Lewis' retirement, and losing Dannell Ellerbe to free agency. Smith soon took control of the starting job. During Week 3 of the regular season, he had his first interception return for a touchdown in a 30–9 victory against the Houston Texans. On December 9, 2013, he broke Ray Lewis' franchise record for most pass deflections in a single season (17) with 19. Smith ended his first season in Baltimore with a team leading 123 tackles and erased any doubts about his ability to still play at a high level after the injury that kept him sidelined most of the 2012 season.[5]

On March 14, 2014, his 32nd birthday, Smith re-signed with the Ravens on a four-year, $16.1 million contract.

Smith recorded 118 tackles, 3 sacks, and an interception in the 2015 season for the Baltimore Ravens. On March 3, 2016, he was released by the Ravens.

Tampa Bay Buccaneers
On March 17, 2016, Smith signed a one-year contract with the Tampa Bay Buccaneers.

References

External links 
Georgia Tech Yellow Jackets bio
Tampa Bay Buccaneers bio
 

1982 births
Living people
American football middle linebackers
American football outside linebackers
Jacksonville Jaguars players
Baltimore Ravens players
Tampa Bay Buccaneers players
Georgia Tech Yellow Jackets football players
Players of American football from Georgia (U.S. state)
Sportspeople from Albany, Georgia